The 1933–34 Divizia A was the twenty-second season of Divizia A, the top-level football league of Romania.

Group 1

League table

Results

Group 2

League table

Results

Final

Top goalscorers

Champion squad

References

Liga I seasons
Romania
1933–34 in Romanian football